Ian Russell (born August 30, 1975) is an American soccer coach and former player. He is currently an assistant coach of MLS club San Jose Earthquakes.

Career 
Russell attended the University of Washington on a soccer scholarship and was a three-time (1994, 1996–97) All-Mountain Pacific Sports Federation first team selection. He then played for the Seattle Sounders of the USL First Division in 1998 and 1999. He won the offensive MVP award in 1999.

Professional playing 
After being drafted by the Seattle Sounders in 1998, Russell played for two seasons in the USL First Division. In 2000, Russell moved to Polish side Lech Poznań, and played only one game in a league cup. He then moved back to the United States to play for Major League Soccer, and he joined the San Jose Earthquakes; Russell appeared in 131 games. A pacy midfielder, he scored five goals and 20 assists, helping the Quakes win two MLS Cups, in 2001 and 2003. He is tied for first in club history in playoff appearances with 14. His best season with San Jose came in 2001, when he scored three goals and nine assists, while starting all 26 regular season games and all six playoffs games. Russell was selected to the 2001 MLS All Star Game, but was later replaced due to injury.

Russell also played three games in 2007 with the Los Angeles Galaxy, under the management of Frank Yallop.

Coaching 
Russell began coaching while playing for the Seattle Sounders and continued coaching while playing for the San Jose Earthquakes.

Russell returned to the San Jose Earthquakes in 2008, as assistant coach. During his first year with the club, Russell helped the team make a very successful return to MLS. This included the team's posting the best record for any expansion team since 1998 with eight wins, 33 points and 32 goals scored. The Quakes also posted a nine-game unbeaten streak from July 12 – Sep 27, which was the longest unbeaten streak in the league in 2008 and the second longest ever by an expansion team.

In the offseason, Russell successfully completed the U.S. Soccer Federation "A" coaching license course.

For the last two games of the 2014 regular season, Russell became interim head coach. Dominic Kinnear eventually took over after the season.

On November 22, 2016, Russell was named the first Head Coach of 2017 USL Expansion Team: Reno 1868 FC.

In his first year under the helm; Russell has guided Reno 1868 FC to a playoff berth, as well as setting some new Records in the USL: Single Season Goals (69*), largest margin of victory in USL history (9). Russell's Reno 1868 team scored more goals over a 4 year period than any team in USL.  Russell guided Reno 1868 to the playoffs all 4 years and was named Coach Of The Year in 2020 and Coach Of The Year Finalist in 2017 and 2019

On February 17, 2021, Toronto FC announced that Russell would be joining the team as an assistant coach.

On January 3, 2023, San Jose announced that Russell would return as an assistant coach under the new technical staff of head coach Luchi Gonzalez.

Record

Player

Coaching

References

1975 births
Living people
American soccer coaches
American soccer players
San Jose Earthquakes players
LA Galaxy players
Seattle Sounders (1994–2008) players
A-League (1995–2004) players
Major League Soccer players
Washington Huskies men's soccer players
Soccer players from Washington (state)
San Jose Earthquakes draft picks
San Jose Earthquakes non-playing staff
San Jose Earthquakes coaches
Association football midfielders
Reno 1868 FC coaches
USL Championship coaches